The 1951 Bordeaux Grand Prix was a non-championship Formula One motor race held in Bordeaux on 29 April 1951.

Classification

Race

References

Bordeaux